Diadasia rinconis is a species of chimney bee in the family Apidae. It is found in Central America and North America.
In the Sonoran Desert, D. rinconis is considered the "cactus bee" as it feeds almost exclusively on a number of Sonoran Desert cactus species, its life cycle revolving around the flowering of the native species of cacti.

Subspecies
These two subspecies belong to the species Diadasia rinconis:
 Diadasia rinconis mimetica Cockerell, 1924
 Diadasia rinconis rinconis Cockerell, 1897

References

Further reading

External links

 

Apinae
Articles created by Qbugbot
Insects described in 1897